Khristo Madzharov (born 28 March 1943) is a Bulgarian biathlete. He competed in the 20 km individual event at the 1976 Winter Olympics.

References

1943 births
Living people
Bulgarian male biathletes
Olympic biathletes of Bulgaria
Biathletes at the 1976 Winter Olympics
Place of birth missing (living people)